Yahya Nadrani (born 14 January 1997) is a French professional footballer who last played as a centre-back for Danish Superliga side AaB.

In November 2022, Nadrani was dropped from Aab's first team after a bust-up with teammate Younes Bakiz. On 19 January 2023, Aab released Nadrani because of the earlier controversy.

Career statistics

Club

Notes

References

1997 births
Living people
French sportspeople of Moroccan descent
French footballers
French expatriate footballers
Association football defenders
AS Saint-Étienne players
R.F.C. Seraing (1922) players
AaB Fodbold players
Championnat National 2 players
Championnat National 3 players
Belgian Third Division players
Challenger Pro League players
Belgian Pro League players
French expatriate sportspeople in Belgium
French expatriate sportspeople in Denmark
Expatriate footballers in Belgium
Expatriate men's footballers in Denmark